(2 December 1918 – 27 May 1990) was a Japanese actress and singer.

Biography
Mieko Takamine was born the eldest daughter of famous chikuzen biwa player and teacher Chikufu Takamine. She gave her acting debut in the 1936 film Kimi yo takarakani utae, produced by the Shochiku studios, to which she would remain affiliated throughout her career, although she would also occasionally appear in productions of other companies after the war. Her first released record as a singer was the theme song for the film Hotaru no hikari (1938), and she soon established herself as a "singing movie star".

Takamine starred in films of Japan's most notable directors, including Hiroshi Shimizu, Yasujirō Ozu, Mikio Naruse and Keisuke Kinoshita.

Selected filmography

Films
The Lights of Asakusa (1937) Dir. Yasujirō Shimazu
The Masseurs and a Woman (1938) Dir. Hiroshi Shimizu
Warm Current (1939) Dir. Kōzaburō Yoshimura
Nobuko (1940) Dir. Hiroshi Shimizu
Brothers and Sisters of the Toda Family (1941) Dir. Yasujirō Ozu
The 47 Ronin (uncredited) (1941) Dir. Kenji Mizoguchi
Once More (1947) Dir. Heinosuke Gosho
Wife (1953) Dir. Mikio Naruse
The Garden of Women (1954) Dir. Keisuke Kinoshita
Elegy of the North (1957) Dir. Heinosuke Gosho
Love Under the Crucifix (1962)
The Sands of Kurobe (1968) Dir. Kei Kumai
The Inugamis (1976) Dir. Kon Ichikawa
Rhyme of Vengeance (1978) Dir. Kon Ichikawa
Hi no Tori (1978) Dir. Kon Ichikawa
Sanada Yukimura no Bōryaku (1979) Dir. Sadao Nakajima
Tempyō no Iraka (1980) Dir. Kei Kumai

Television
Monkey (1978)
Ōoku (1983)
Hissatsu Watashinin (1983)

Awards
In 1976, Takamine won the Best Supporting Actress award at the 19th Blue Ribbon Awards for her role in The Inugamis (1976). In 1985, she was awarded the Medal of Purple Ribbon and a special Mainichi Film Award for her longtime achievements as a performer.

References

External links
 
 

1918 births
1990 deaths
Actresses from Tokyo